Valerie Alexander is an American author, speaker, screenwriter and director.

Her TED Talk, “How to Outsmart Your Own Unconscious Bias,” is frequently cited as one of the top TED talks on unconscious bias and diversity, equity and inclusion, and is used as a teaching tool in classrooms and boardrooms around the world. 

Valerie has spoken at hundreds of conferences, colleges, companies, and government, military and police agencies on the topics of unconscious bias, workplace happiness, and the advancement of women, and was one the featured Keynote speakers for the University of South Florida - Muma College of Business Diversity, Equity and Inclusion in the Workplace Certificate, with more than 135,000 people enrolled. 

Valerie is the screenwriter of “Memories of Christmas,” starring Christina Milian and Mark Taylor,  which first aired on Hallmark Movies & Mysteries in 2018. This film has been named on several “Best of Hallmark Christmas movies” lists, including “10 Must-See Hallmark Movies that Celebrate Diversity and Inclusion.”  

Valerie has written screenplays and developed television shows for Joel Schumacher, Catherine Zeta Jones, Ice Cube, and others. She directed the award-winning short films "Making the Cut” and Ballpark Bullies, and is the creator, producer and director of "The Wedding Matters,” "Say I Do,” and "Life Support," three successful commercial campaigns in support of marriage equality. 

Her books include, "Happiness as a Second Language: A Guidebook to Achieving Lasting, Permanent Happiness", "Success as a Second Language: A Guidebook for Defining and Achieving Personal Success", and "How Women Can Succeed in the Workplace (Despite Having 'Female Brains')". She holds the U.S. Registered Trademark on the phrase, “…as a Second Language” for the self-help and personal growth space, and as that trademark holder, publishes works by other authors, including Parenting as a Second Language by Elisabeth Stitt, Creativity as a Second Language by Nancy Pia, Grief as a Second Language by Stacy Parker, and Mindfulness as a Second Language by Nicholas Stein, CMT-P.

Prior to becoming a writer-director and author, Valerie was a corporate securities lawyer, an investment banker and an Internet executive in the Silicon Valley.

Valerie received her B.A. from Trinity University and her J.D. and M.S. degrees from U.C., Berkeley, and an honors certificate in the Science of Happiness from U.C., Berkeley’s Greater Good Science Center. In the Spring of 2010, she returned to Berkeley Law to teach "Representation of Law in Film," and was the 2016 commencement speaker for Trinity University, delivering the address, “Tiger at Heart.” 

Before entering the professional ranks, Valerie paid for her own education working as: a horse wrangler; an algebra teacher; a runway model; a tutor for the developmentally disabled; an amusement park supervisor; an SAT, GRE & LSAT prep teacher; and a variety of food service jobs.

Valerie is a member of the Writers Guild of America, West, and lives in Los Angeles with her husband, writer-producer Rick Alexander.

References

External links

Living people
American non-fiction writers
American women screenwriters
American directors
Year of birth missing (living people)
Writers from Los Angeles
Trinity University (Texas) alumni
University of California, Berkeley alumni
American women journalists
UC Berkeley School of Law alumni
Screenwriters from California
Film people from Los Angeles
21st-century American women